Tellurocysteine (in some publications referred to as Te-Cys) is an amino acid with the formula .  It would be the heavy analogue of serine, cysteine, and selenocysteine. Tellurol (RTeH) is a rare and fragile functional group, especially alkyl derivatives.  Furthermore the C-Te bond (200 kJ/mol) is weak compared to 234 kJ/mol for the C-Se bond. These factors combine to make tellurocysteine very labile. Even selenocysteine occurs only rarely in nature.  Instead of tellurocysteine, tellurocystine is generally isolated instead. It has the formula , with a central Te-Te bond.

Properties
The fungus Aspergillus fumigatus is capable of incorporating tellurocysteine (and telluromethionine) into proteins when grown in appropriate media.

When incorporated into glutathione transferase, tellurocysteine efficiently inhibited aminoacylation and increased the efficiency of glutathione peroxidase.

Synthesis

L-Tellurocystine has been prepared in low yield from a protected form of 3-iodoalanine.  Thus, methyl (2R)-2-[(tert-butoxycarbonyl)amino]-3-iodopropionate reacts with lithium telluride to produce tellurocystine.

References

Amino acids
Organotellurium compounds